Hobson's Choice is a 1931 British comedy drama film directed by Thomas Bentley and starring James Harcourt, Viola Lyel, Frank Pettingell and Herbert Lomas. Based on the 1916 play Hobson's Choice by Harold Brighouse, it follows the tale of a coarse bootshop owner who becomes outraged when his eldest daughter decides to marry a meek cobbler. It was produced by the leading British company of the time, British International Pictures, at their studios in Elstree.

The film is missing from the BFI National Archive, and is listed as one of the British Film Institute's "75 Most Wanted" lost films. An earlier silent film version of the play had been released in 1920.

Cast

References

Bibliography
Low, Rachael. Filmmaking in 1930s Britain. George Allen & Unwin, 1985.
Wood, Linda. British Films, 1927-1939. British Film Institute, 1986.

External links

1931 comedy-drama films
British comedy-drama films
1930s English-language films
Films shot at British International Pictures Studios
Films directed by Thomas Bentley
Films set in Lancashire
Films set in England
Lost British films
British black-and-white films
1931 lost films
Lost comedy-drama films
1931 films
1930s British films